Little Big Women is a 2020 Taiwanese drama film directed by Joseph Hsu, adapted from an eponymous 2017 short film. The film premiered in October 2020 at the Busan International Film Festival. The film became a box office hit in Taiwan.

Plot
Lin Xiu-ying (Chen Shu-fang) is a well-known restaurant owner in Tainan. Without the support of her husband, she has single handedly raised three daughters by selling shrimp rolls at a roadside stall. Since then, her daughters have grown up with remarkable achievements. Her eldest daughter A-Qing (Hsieh Ying-xuan) is an international dancer, the second daughter A-Yu (Vivian Hsu) works as a plastic surgeon in Taipei, and the youngest daughter Jia-jia (Sun Ke-fang) oversees the restaurant business. On the day of her 70th birthday, Xiu-ying receives news of her husband's passing. While preparing for his funeral, she unexpectedly meets Ms Tsai (Ding Ning) who accompanied her husband through his old age, grappling with a long-buried resentment held over the years.

Cast
 Chen Shu-fang as Lin Xiu-ying (林秀英)
 Hsieh Ying-xuan as Chen Wan-qing (陳宛青)
 Vivian Hsu as Chen Wan-yu (陳宛瑜)
 Sun Ke-fang as Chen Wan-jia (陳宛佳)
 Ding Ning as Tsai Mei-lin (蔡美林)
 Buffy Chen as Yang Yi-cheng (楊奕澄)

Awards and nominations

References

External links 

 

Taiwanese drama films
2020 drama films
2020s Mandarin-language films
Taiwanese-language films